Grassau is the name of a number of places in Germany.
Grassau, Bavaria
Grassau, Brandenburg
Grassau, Saxony-Anhalt

bar:Grassau
eo:Grassau
ro:Grassau
ru:Грассау